Anatomy of a Hate Crime is a 2001 American made-for-television docudrama based on a true crime; it was written by Max Ember and directed by Tim Hunter. It stars Cy Carter, Brendan Fletcher, and Ian Somerhalder. The film is based on the 1998 murder of Matthew Shepard. It premiered on MTV on December 10, 2001, and was nominated for a GLAAD Media Award for Outstanding TV Movie or Limited Series. After the broadcast, MTV went dark for 17  hours while it aired a continuous on-screen scroll listing the names of hundreds of United States hate crime victims.

Premise
Based on the 1998 murder of gay college student Matthew Shepard.

Cast
 Cy Carter as Matthew Shepard
 Brendan Fletcher as Aaron McKinney
 Ian Somerhalder as Russell Henderson
 Busy Philipps as Chasity Pasley
 Amanda Fuller as Kristen Price
 Gabrielle Miller as Kara Dupree
 Richard Stroh as Carter Grey
 Timothy Webber as Officer Slade
 Grant Linneberg as Officer John Ryan
 Carrie Schiffler as Officer Vicky Reese
 David Haysom as Barrett Cooper

Production
Immediately following the broadcast, MTV News hosted a special on hate crimes, and then the cable station aired a continuous on-screen scroll listing the names of hundreds of United States hate crime victims. The scroll ran continuously and commercial free for seventeen and-a-half hours, and was the first time in its 20 year history, the network went dark. It was estimated that it cost MTV about $2 million in advertising revenue.

Writer Max Ember said the script wasn't really about Matthew Shepard, but "about the murder of Matthew Shepard". He thought by portraying the story from the point of view of Aaron McKinney and Russell Henderson, the two murderers, "that something very unique could happen". He said "Aaron and Russell didn't have any great political agenda, any great belief system in fact at all". Ember went on to opine that "they didn't hate gay people any more than anyone else they knew...they didn't wake up in the morning and say 'we're gonna kill a fag'...nonetheless that's exactly what happened and I thought it's worthy of discovering why that would happen."

Cy Carter recalled the project being secretive in nature when he first auditioned. He said when he first read the script "everyone's names were different", but when he was asked back for a second audition, they told him it was a Matthew Shepard story. Carter said it was difficult to re-create the beating/murder scene, and it left the cast and production crew all in tears. He said Brendan Fletcher and Ian Somerhalder, were both in tears because "they had to go places inside of themselves I'm sure were kind of scary to rummage up that kind of hatred, and this wasn't even real, but just to see that, a tenth of what it would have been like for him [Shepard], just made them realize what an important film they were working on".

The Matthew Shepard Foundation put out the following statement in relation to the film:

Critical reception
The Washington Post wrote in their review that the best parts of the film are "the performances of Cy Carter as the 21-year-old Shepard and Brendan Fletcher as one of his killers, Aaron McKinney...the worst part is that writer Max Ember couldn't settle on a timeline and so jumps all over the calendar like a jack rabbit...murder anatomies, especially ones hoping to teach lessons, should be methodical and thorough, and this hopscotching technique is distracting and lazy".

The Baltimore Sun said it is "not only a good movie, but also one with the potential to do good". They praised Ian Somerhalder's performance as "outstanding", and said the character he portrayed, Russell Henderson, is "made comprehensible by a smart script", [however] the producers took a big risk "humanizing someone who committed such a monstrous act...but they are wise enough to understand that the only way we will understand our own capacity for hate is to recognize our own worst impulses and passions in the killers...In the end, this is what makes the film worthy of being judged as art rather than just propaganda".

See also

Cultural depictions of Matthew Shepard
The Laramie Project
Matthew Shepard Foundation
The Matthew Shepard Story
Violence against LGBT people

References

External links

Anatomy of a Hate Crime at BFI

2001 television films
2001 films
2001 LGBT-related films
2000s biographical drama films
American biographical drama films
American crime drama films
American films based on actual events
Biographical television films
Crime films based on actual events
Drama films based on actual events
American LGBT-related television films
MTV original films
Films set in Wyoming
Gay-related films
Works about Matthew Shepard
LGBT-related drama films
LGBT-related films based on actual events
Films about violence against LGBT people
American drama television films
2000s English-language films
2000s American films